Events in the year 1899 in Japan. It corresponds to Meiji 32 (明治32年) in the Japanese calendar.

Incumbents
Emperor: Emperor Meiji
Prime Minister: Yamagata Aritomo

Governors
Aichi Prefecture: Mori Mamoru
Akita Prefecture: Takeda Chiyosaburo
Aomori Prefecture: Munakata Tadashi 
Ehime Prefecture: Tai Neijro
Fukui Prefecture: Saburo Iwao 
Fukushima Prefecture: Kimumichi Nagusami then Arita Yoshisuke
Gifu Prefecture: Tanaka Takamichi then Kawaji Toshikyo
Gunma Prefecture: Suehiro Naokata 
Hiroshima Prefecture: Asada Tokunori
Ibaraki Prefecture: Prince Kiyoshi Honba then Fumi Kashiwada 
Iwate Prefecture: Ganri Hojo 
Kagawa Prefecture: Yoshihara Saburo 
Kochi Prefecture: Tadashi Tanigawa 
Kumamoto Prefecture: Tokuhisa Tsunenori 
Kyoto Prefecture: Baron Utsumi Tadakatsu then Baron Shoichi Omori
Mie Prefecture: Yuji Rika then Duke Isaburo Yamagata then Arakawa Yoshitaro
Miyagi Prefecture: Motohiro Onoda 
Miyazaki Prefecture: Sukeo Kabawaya 
Nagano Prefecture: Oshikawa Sokkichi 
Niigata Prefecture: Minoru Katsumata 
Oita Prefecture: Marques Okubo Toshi Takeshi 
Okinawa Prefecture: Shigeru Narahara
Osaka Prefecture: Tadashini Kikuchi
Saga Prefecture: Seki Kiyohide 
Saitama Prefecture: Marquis Okubo Toshi Takeshi
Shiname Prefecture: Matsunaga Takeyoshi
Tochigi Prefecture: Korechika 
Tokyo: Baron Sangay Takatomi
Toyama Prefecture: Kaneoryo Gen
Yamagata Prefecture: Baron Seki Yoshiomi

Events
February 1 – Telephone service begins between Tokyo and Osaka.
February 7 – Keiō and Waseda become Japan's first private universities.
February 13 – The income tax law is promulgated.
March 1 – Sankyo Pharmaceutical established in Yokohama, as predecessor of Daiichi Sankyo.
March 4 – Japan passes its first copyright law
July 17 – NEC Corporation is organized as the first Japanese joint venture with foreign capital.
November – Momijigari, the oldest extant Japanese film, is shot an open space behind the Kabuki-za in Tokyo.
Unknown date – Morinaga Confectionery was founded, as predecessor name was Morinaga Western Confectionery.
Unknown date –  The Hokkaido Former Aborigines Protection Act is enacted by the Imperial Diet

Births
January 20 – Kenjiro Takayanagi, television engineer, creator of the world's first all-electronic television receiver (d. 1990)
February 10 – Suihō Tagawa, manga artist  (d. 1989)
February 13 – Yuriko Miyamoto, novelist  (d. 1951)
March 7 – Jun Ishikawa, writer  (d. 1987)
June 11 – Yasunari Kawabata, writer, novelist, Nobel laureate in Literature  (d. 1972)
August 1 – Saburō Matsukata, journalist, businessman and mountaineer (d. 1973)
August 5 – Sakae Tsuboi, novelist and poet  (d. 1967)
September 8 – Akiko Seki, soprano (d. 1973)
October 1 – Matsutarō Kawaguchi, novelist, playwright and film producer (d. 1985)
November 7 – Daisuke Nanba, communist activist (d. 1924)
December 3 – Hayato Ikeda, Prime Minister of Japan (d. 1965)
Unknown – Genkei Masamune, botanist, (d. 1993)

Deaths
January 21 – Katsu Kaishū, statesman and naval engineer (b. 1823)
May 11 – Kawakami Soroku. General (b. 1848)
September 26 – Ōki Takatō, statesman, Mayor of Tokyo (b. 1832)
December 26 – Harada Naojirō, yōga-style painter (b. 1863)

References

 
1890s in Japan
Japan
Years of the 19th century in Japan